The 1971 Tasman Series was a motor racing competition staged in New Zealand and Australia for cars complying with the Tasman Formula. The series, which began on 2 January and ended on 28 February after seven races, was the eighth annual Tasman Series. It was won by Graham McRae of New Zealand, driving a McLaren M10B Chevrolet.

Races

The series was contested over seven races.

Points system
Series points were awarded at each race on the following basis:

All points scored by each driver were retained to determine final series placings.

Series standings

References

1971
Tasman Series
Tasman Series
Formula 5000